Arturo Fernández Meyzán (3 February 1906 – 27 November 1999) was a Peruvian football defender who played for Peru in the 1930 FIFA World Cup. He also played for Universitario de Deportes, and for Peru at the 1936 Summer Olympics.

His brother Teodoro Fernández Meyzán also was a footballer and Peru international player.

References

External links

1906 births
1999 deaths
People from Lima Region
Association football defenders
Peruvian footballers
Peru international footballers
Ciclista Lima Association footballers
Club Universitario de Deportes footballers
Colo-Colo footballers
Peruvian Primera División players
Chilean Primera División players
Expatriate footballers in Chile
1930 FIFA World Cup players
Olympic footballers of Peru
Footballers at the 1936 Summer Olympics
Club Universitario de Deportes managers
Copa América-winning players
Peruvian football managers
Peru national football team managers